Karimian is an Iranian surname. Notable people with the surname include:

Mehdi Karimian (born 1980), Iranian footballer
Mehrdad Karimian (born 1982), Iranian footballer and coach
Saeed Karimian (1972–2017), Iranian television executive

Iranian-language surnames